OOPARTS is a compilation album by the Japanese experimental music group Shun, released on DIW Records in 1994. The title of the album references out-of-place artifacts.

Overview

OOPARTS includes every song released by Shun over its four-year period of activity. It features heavy use of sampling.

Shun's composer Susumu Hirasawa remarked in the album's liner notes that the music did not age well, citing a loss of its original uniqueness and shock value.

Track listing

Personnel
Susumu Hirasawa - shun (Vocals, HEAVENIZER), SHUN 2nd, SHUN IIIrd SHEETS (Drums, Acoustic guitar, Electric Guitar Bass, Keyboard, Voice, Effects, Noise) and SHUN・4
Akiro "Kamio" Arishima - shun (Tapes, Percussion)
Akemi Tsujitani - shun (Vocals, Synthesizer)
Iwao Asama - shun (Atmosphere)
Yuji Matsuda - SHUN 2nd, SHUN IIIrd SHEETS (Rhythm Adjustment, Electric Bass Guitar, Keyboard, Main Vocals, Effects) and SHUN・4
Teruo Nakano - SHUN 2nd
Hiromi Seki - SHUN・4
Shuichi Sugawara - SHUN・4
Shigeo Motojima - SHUN・4
The oldman, who was on the way to IWATE. - SHUN・4
Boris Karloff and O.P. Heggie - sampled acting in "Conditioning Cycle"
Domenico Ghirlandaio - cover art (Saint Jerome in His Study)

References

External links
 
 OOPARTS at NO ROOM - The official site of Susumu Hirasawa (P-MODEL)

Shun (band) albums
Japanese-language compilation albums
1994 compilation albums
DIW Records albums